Innamincka Regional Reserve is a protected area located in the north-east of South Australia which includes the town of Innamincka. The regional reserve was proclaimed on 22 December 1988 under National Parks and Wildlife Act 1972 over a parcel of land previously part of the Innamincka Pastoral Lease to recognise it as "a place of major conservation importance" whilst permitting ongoing mining and agricultural activity. It was the first "multiple use reserve to be administered by a nature conservation agency" to be declared in South Australia under the category of regional reserve provided for in the National Parks and Wildlife Act 1972. It is partly located on land that was included on the List of Wetlands of International Importance under the Ramsar Convention under the name Coongie Lakes in 1987. In 2005, a parcel of land was excised from the regional reserve to create the national park now known as Malkumba-Coongie Lakes National Park. It also includes the Innamincka/Cooper Creek state heritage area. The regional reserve is classified as an IUCN Category VI protected area.

See also
 Protected areas of South Australia
 Regional reserves of South Australia

References

External links
Innamincka Regional Reserve official webpage
Entry for Innamincka Regional Reserve on protected planet

Regional reserves of South Australia
Protected areas established in 1988
1988 establishments in Australia
Far North (South Australia)